The 2018–19 Eastern Michigan Eagles men's basketball team represented Eastern Michigan University during the 2018–19 NCAA Division I men's basketball season. The Eagles, led by eighth-year head coach Rob Murphy, played their home games at the Convocation Center in Ypsilanti, Michigan as members of the West Division of the Mid-American Conference. They finished the season 15–17, 9–9 in MAC play to finish in third place in the West Division. They lost in the first round of the MAC tournament to Ball State.

Previous season
They finished the season 22–13, 11–7 in MAC play to finish in second place in the West Division. They defeated Akron in the quarterfinals of the MAC tournament before losing in the semifinals to Toledo. They were invited to the CollegeInsider.com Tournament where they defeated Niagara in the first round before losing in the second round to Sam Houston State.

Offseason

Departures

Incoming transfers

Roster

Preseason
The Eagles were predicted to finish first in the MAC West by several college basketball preseason magazines. Those included Lindy's Sports College BasketballLindy's Sports, Athlon Sports College Basketball and Street & Smith's Basketball Yearbook.

Preseason Awards 
Kareem Abdul-Jabbar Award Preseason Watch List
 James Thompson IV
Julius Erving Award Watch List
 Elijah Minnie

Street & Smith's Basketball 

All Conference 
 James Thompson IV
All Newcomer
 Andre Rafus Jr.
All Defense
 James Thompson IV
All Sharpshooter
 Elijah Minnie

Athlon Sports 

All MAC First Team 
 James Thompson IV

Lindy's Sports 

All Conference First Team 
 James Thompson IV
All Conference Second Team 
 Elijah Minnie
Player of the Year 
 James Thompson IV
Best Rebounder 
 James Thompson IV
Best Defender 
 James Thompson IV
Most Versatile 
 Elijah Minnie
Best NBA Prospect 
 James Thompson IV

Schedule and results

|-
!colspan=9 style=| Non-conference regular season

|-
!colspan=9 style=| MAC regular season

|-
!colspan=9 style=| MAC tournament

|-

Game notes

Drexel 
 Education Day

References

Eastern Michigan Eagles men's basketball seasons
Eastern Michigan
Eastern Michigan Eagles men's basketball
Eastern Michigan Eagles men's basketball